Sakti district is one of the four new district in the state of Chhattisgarh, India announced by Bhupesh Baghel on 15th August 2021. It is carved out from Janjgir-Champa district.  The district was formerly the princely state of Sakti, which joined Bilaspur district after Independence.

The district is located in the Mahanadi river valley, with several hill ranges in the south of the district. The Mahanadi forms the southern boundary of the district.

Demographics

At the time of the 2011 census, Sakti district had a population of 653,036. Sakti district has a sex ratio of 1004 females to 1000 males. 9.42% of the population lives in urban areas. Scheduled Castes and Scheduled Tribes make up 148,386 (22.72%) and 104,296 (15.97%) of the population respectively.

At the time of the 2011 Census of India, 95.98% of the population in the district spoke Chhattisgarhi and 2.72% Hindi as their first language.

References

Districts of Chhattisgarh